Ute Kumitz (born 26 February 1960) is a German rower. She competed in the women's quadruple sculls event at the 1984 Summer Olympics.

References

External links
 

1960 births
Living people
German female rowers
Olympic rowers of West Germany
Rowers at the 1984 Summer Olympics
Sportspeople from Hanover
20th-century German women
21st-century German women